The 2000–01 Serie A (known as the Serie A TIM for sponsorship reasons) was the 99th season of top-tier Italian football, the 69th in a round-robin tournament. It was contested by 18 teams, for the 13th consecutive season since 1988–89.

Roma won its first Scudetto since 1982–83, its third title overall. Juventus finished second, and these two teams automatically qualified for the first group stage of the 2001–02 UEFA Champions League. Lazio, the defending champions, and Parma finished third and fourth respectively, to enter the third qualifying round of the same competition. Internazionale and Milan finished fifth and sixth respectively, and qualified for the 2001–02 UEFA Cup along with Fiorentina, the winners of the Coppa Italia. Brescia gained entry into the 2001 UEFA Intertoto Cup.

Vicenza, Napoli and Bari were automatically relegated to Serie B. Reggina and Hellas Verona were forced to contest a relegation tie-breaker after finishing level on points, with Verona winning on away goals to relegate Reggina.

Rule changes
In the middle of the season, the old quota system was abolished, meaning that each team was no longer limited to having no more than five non-EU players and using no more than three in each match.

Passport scandal
Concurrent with the abolition of the quota system, the Italian Football Federation (FIGC) investigated footballers from South America and Africa who had used fake passports in order to enable their teams to field them as Europeans. Alberto, Warley, Alejandro Da Silva and Jorginho of Udinese, Fábio Júnior and Gustavo Bartelt of Roma, Dida of Milan, Álvaro Recoba of Inter, Thomas Job, Francis Zé and Jean Ondoa of Sampdoria, and Jeda and André Leone of Vicenza were all handed bans in July 2001, ranging from six months to one year. However, most of these bans were subsequently reduced.

Personnels and sponsoring

(*) Promoted from Serie B.

Managerial changes

League table

Results

Overall records
 Highest number of wins: Roma (22)
 Lowest number of losses: Juventus, Roma (3 each)
 Highest number of draws: Atalanta, Brescia (15 each)
 Lowest number of wins: Bari (5)
 Highest number of losses: Bari (24)
 Lowest number of draws: Bari, Udinese (5 each)
 Highest number of goals for: Roma (68)
 Lowest number of goals against: Juventus (27)
 Lowest number of goals for: Bari (31)
 Highest number of goals against: Bari (68)
 Best goal difference: Roma (35)
 Worst goal difference: Bari (−37)

Relegation tie-breaker

Reggina relegated to Serie B.

Top goalscorers

Number of teams by region

References and sources
Almanacco Illustrato del Calcio – La Storia 1898-2004, Panini Edizioni, Modena, September 2005

See also
 Tim Parks, A Season with Verona (London: Vintage, 2002) – A personal account by a celebrated English author and fan of the fortunes of Hellas Verona that season, including the team's narrow avoidance of relegation.

Footnotes

External links

  – All results on RSSSF Website.
 2000/2001 Serie A Squads – (www.footballsquads.com)

Serie A seasons
Italy
1